Thumri is a vocal genre or style of Indian music. The term "thumri" is derived from the Hindi verb thumuknaa, which means "to walk with a dancing gait in such a way that the ankle-bells tinkle." The form is, thus, connected with dance, dramatic gestures, mild eroticism, evocative love poetry and folk songs, especially from Uttar Pradesh, though there are regional variations.

The text is romantic or devotional in nature, the lyrics are usually in Uttar Pradesh dialects of Hindi called Awadhi and Brij Bhasha. Thumree is characterized by its sensuality, and by a greater flexibility with the raga.

Thumri is also used as a generic name for some other, even lighter, forms such as Dadra, Hori, Kajari, Sawani, Jhoola, and Chaiti, even though each of them have their own structure and content — either lyrical or musical or both—and so the exposition of these forms vary. Like Indian classical music itself, some of these forms have their origin in folk literature and music.

Structure
As in khayal, thumri has two parts, the sthayi and the antara. It favours tala-s such as Deepchandi, Roopak, Addha, and Punjabi. These tala-s are characterized by a special lilt, nearly absent in the tala-s used in khayal. Thumri compositions are mostly in raga-s such as Kafi, Khamaj, Jogiya, Bhairavi, Pilu and Pahadi. A common feature of these and other such raga-s is the free movement they allow the artist, since they do not depend for their identity on rigidly formulated tonal sequences, irrespective of the compositions involved. In fact, one may say that they have a built-in provision for mixing raga-s  or for moving out of the raga actually presented in order to add colour to the proceedings.

Origins
The exact origins of thumri are not very clear, given that there are no historical references to such a form until the 15th century. The first mention of Thumri goes back to the 19th century, with a link to the classical dance form Kathak. This was the bandish ki thumri or bol-baant and it evolved mostly in Lucknow in the court of nawab Wajid Ali Shah. At that time, it was a song sung by tawaifs or courtesans. According to historical records, a new version of thumri arose in the late 19th century, which was independent of dance, and much more slow-paced. This form was called bol-banav and it evolved in Varanasi.

Thumri and khayal
Unlike the khayal, which pays meticulous attention to unfolding a raga, thumri restricts itself to expressing the countless hues of shringar by combining melody and words. The contours of a khayal are most definitely broader and fluid. Thus, a khayal singer is capable of encompassing and expressing a wide range of complex emotions. A thumri singer goes straight to the emotional core of a composition and evokes each yarn of amorous feeling, each strand of sensuous sentiment, with great discretion. Khayal aims at achieving poise and splendour; thumri is quicksilver in tone and ardently romantic in spirit. It needs a delicate heart, and a supple and soulful voice capable of expressing several shadings and colours of tones to bring out its beauty. To draw an analogy from the world of painting, khayal is closer, in form and spirit, to the unrestrained and energetic world of Renaissance masters like Michelangelo, Raphael and Titian – forcefully executed brush strokes are seen on a broad canvas; whereas thumri, with its affinity for finer points and shades of feeling, emotion and mood, is closer to the finely-detailed still-life paintings of the Dutch masters of the 17th century.

Noted thumri artists

Purab ang
Well-known artists of the 'purab ang' thumri' of the Benaras gharana or Banaras gayaki include Rasoolan Bai (1902–1974), Siddheshwari Devi (1908–1977), Girija Devi (1929–2017), Mahadev Prasad Mishra (1906–1995) and Chhannulal Mishra (b. 1936).

Some other singers of thumri are Gauhar Jan (1873–1930), Begum Akhtar (1914–1974), Shobha Gurtu (1925–2004), Noor Jehan (1926–2000) and Nirmala Devi (1927-1996). The bol banao style has a slow tempo and is concluded by a laggi, a faster phase where the tabla player has some freedom of improvisation.

Another stalwart in the genre of thumri was Naina Devi (1917–1993), who was married to a royal family but later devoted her life to the singing of the song of Tawaifs. For a member of the royal family to take such a step in those days meant fighting countless social stigmas that had enough power to totally alienate someone from the society, but she had the support of her husband.

Classical thumri

Some khyal singers took an interest in thumrī and sang it their own way, as in the case of Abdul Karim Khan, Faiyaz Khan, Bade Ghulam Ali Khan, Bhimsen Joshi, Madhav Gudi, Rajan and Sajan Mishra, Barkat Ali Khan, Jagdish Prasad and Prabha Atre.

Today thumrī is sometimes sung at the end of khyal concerts as a concluding item.
Besides the tabla and the tanpura, other typical instruments in thumri are sarangi, harmonium and swarmandal.

Lyrics

Thumrī singers pay considerable attention to the lyrics, though they may be difficult to follow in the ornamented enunciation. This is especially where the focus is on love, and many lyrics deal with separation or viraha. Krishna's ras leela or love play with Radha and other gopis of Vrindavan appear frequently. As an example, here are the lyrics of a thumrī composed by the medieval poet Lalan, celebrating Krishna's flute – how its tunes are driving Radha mad. Braj or Vrindavan is where Krishna is indulging in this love play; Radha is the "Girl of Braj".

References

Further reading
 Dance in Thumri, by Projesh Banerji. Published by Abhinav Publications, 1986. .
 Thumri in Historical and Stylistic Perspectives, by Peter Lamarche Manuel. Published by Motilal Banarsidass Publ., 1989. ..
 Thumri, Tradition & Trends, by Ramanlal Chhotalal Mehta, Published by Indian Musicological Society, 1990.
 Hindi Poetry in a Musical Genre: Thumri Lyrics, by Lalita Du Perron. Published by Routledge, 2007. .

External links
Article: Semi-classical song

 
Indian classical music
Hindustani music genres
Hindustani music terminology